Kinesin-like protein KIFC3 is a protein that in humans is encoded by the KIFC3 gene.

References

Further reading

External links